Irish Field served as the home to the Tempe Normal football team from 1927 to 1935 before being replaced by Goodwin Stadium in 1936.

History

Tempe Normal gained accreditation as a 4-year institute in 1925.  It was quickly decided the football team would need a new larger home. In 1927 ground was broken on the new stadium.  The stadium was named for Fred Irish who was the head coach of the team for its first 8 seasons.  Irish Field was located where the current Memorial Union sits on campus.  Stadium lighting was added to Irish Field in 1930, allowing the team to play night games.

References

Defunct college football venues
Arizona State Sun Devils football venues
Arizona State University buildings
American football venues in Arizona
Sports venues in Tempe, Arizona
1927 establishments in Arizona
Sports venues completed in 1927